Denby Dale railway station serves the village of Denby Dale, in West Yorkshire, England and the surrounding area.

Opened by the Huddersfield & Sheffield Junction Railway in 1850 (which subsequently became part of the Lancashire & Yorkshire Railway), it originally had two platforms but lost the northbound one when the Clayton West Junction to Penistone section was singled in 1969.

Facilities and ticketing

Station facilities 
The station has only a single platform. It is accessed by either a ramp from the car park or by a subway. The only remaining station buildings are in private industrial use, but there is a standard waiting shelter on the platform. Timetable information is provided on posters, but there are no information screens or automated announcements. No step-free access is available to the platform - the main entrance via the car park has a high kerb that can cause difficulties for wheelchair users, whilst the pedestrian subway at the south end has steps.

The station is unstaffed, with no ticket buying facilities, and passengers must buy their tickets prior to travel or from the conductor on the train.

Passenger Transport Executive ticket validity 
Denby Dale is a boundary station for both West Yorkshire PTE and South Yorkshire PTE. Therefore, tickets for both PTEs are valid to and from this station.

Services

On Monday to Saturday, trains operate hourly towards  northbound and Sheffield via  southbound; this also runs hourly in each direction on Sundays.

References

External links

Railway stations in Kirklees
DfT Category F1 stations
Former Lancashire and Yorkshire Railway stations
Northern franchise railway stations
Railway stations in Great Britain opened in 1850
railway station